Roman Solis is the name of:

Román Alí Solís López, Mexican baseball catcher
Román Solís Zelaya, Costa Rican jurist
Román Villalobos Solís, Costa Rican cyclist
Marcos Antonio Román Solís, Nicaraguan footballer